Brian Stuart Roberts (28 April 1945 – 6 August 2016) was an Australian rules football player who played in the VFL between 1971 and 1975 for the Richmond Football Club (as well as a short stint with South Melbourne in 1975).
Roberts was known as "The Whale" due to his enormous stature and played as a ruckman. He was the only player to have represented all three States, South Australia, Victoria and Western Australia.

Early life
Roberts was born in the UK, and with his family emigrated to  Millicent. In his late teens the 199 cm ruckman was attracting interest from VFL clubs but new South Adelaide coach Neil Kerley, persuaded Roberts to join the Club.

SANFL

Roberts joined South Adelaide in 1964 and debuted the following year. He learnt the craft of being a ruckman from his teammate and coach Neil Kerley.

WAFL
Robert spent four seasons with East Fremantle, it included being selected in the Western Australian state team in 1969.

VFL

 enticed him to Victoria where he played from 1971-1975, and was a Premiership player in 1973 and 1974. He also represented Victoria in interstate games..

Roberts was part of the John Pitura trade in which Pitura went to Richmond in exchange for Roberts, Francis Jackson and Graham Teasdale. In the 15 games he played with the Swans he caught the umpire eye and was second in the Brownlow Medal.

In the 1976 pre-season he had a disagreement with coach Ian Stewart and walked out on South Melbourne. 

Roberts was a publican and for many years had a hotel in South Melbourne. "Have a ale with the Whale" was his motto. In the 1990s he took over the licensee of the Duke of Wellington Hotel in Flinders St, as well as writing newspaper columns and radio football commentary.

He died on 6 August 2016.

References

1971 Tiger Year Book - Richmond Football Club

1945 births
2016 deaths
Richmond Football Club players
Richmond Football Club Premiership players
Sydney Swans players
East Fremantle Football Club players
South Adelaide Football Club players
Australian rules footballers from South Australia
Australian rules footballers from Western Australia
People from Millicent, South Australia
Two-time VFL/AFL Premiership players